Seydou Sy (born 12 December 1995) is a Senegalese association footballer who plays as a goalkeeper.

Club career

Monaco

Sy is a youth exponent from AS Monaco. He made his first team debut on 20 May 2017 in the final Ligue 1 match of Monaco's championship season against Rennes, a 3–2 away win; he started the match and kept a clean sheet before being replaced by fellow debutant Loïc Badiashile at halftime. He and fellow goalkeepers Danijel Subašić and Diego Benaglio were all released in June 2020.

Nacional

On 11 February 2021, Sy signed a short-term contract with Portuguese Primeira Liga strugglers Nacional. On 24 May, after not appearing officially for the club, it was announced that his contract had been terminated, following the Madeira side's relegation to the second tier.

Honors
Monaco
Ligue 1: 2016–17

Senegal
 Jeux de la Francophonie bronze medalist: 2013

Career statistics

References

External links
Monaco profile

1995 births
Living people
Senegalese footballers
Association football goalkeepers
Senegalese expatriate footballers
Expatriate footballers in Monaco
Senegalese expatriate sportspeople in Monaco
Ligue 1 players
AS Monaco FC players
Footballers from Dakar